Canthigaster aziz, known as Aziz's toby, is a species of pufferfish in the family Tetraodontidae. It was described in 2020 by Keiichi Matsuura, Sergey V. Bogorodsky, Ahmad O. Mal, and Tilman J. Alpermann based on a single specimen collected from the northern Red Sea off of Saudi Arabia. It was trawled from a depth of 315 m (1033 ft), which is reportedly the second highest depth at which any fish of the genus Canthigaster has been collected. The only known specimen measures 2 cm (0.8 inches) SL. The species was named after the King Abdulaziz University. It is thought to have been collected over a hard substrate as the trawling gear used to collect it was severely damaged during operation.

Evolutionarily, C. aziz belongs to a unique and newly discovered lineage of Canthigaster, being phylogenetically distinct from all of its congeners.

References 

Taxa named by Keiichi Matsuura
Taxa named by Sergey V. Bogorodsky
Taxa named by Ahmad O. Mal
Taxa named by Tilman J. Alpermann
Fish described in 2020
aziz
Fish of the Red Sea